Ángel Rogelio Patrick Garth (born February 27, 1992) is a Panamanian professional footballer.

Club career
Patrick plays his club football for Árabe Unido.

International career
Patrick earned his first cap against Nicaragua in the 2014 Copa Centroamericana where he came on as a substitute. He was called up for the 2015 CONCACAF Gold Cup as a replacement for Roberto Chen.

References

External links

1992 births
Living people
Panamanian footballers
Panama international footballers
2014 Copa Centroamericana players
2015 CONCACAF Gold Cup players
2017 Copa Centroamericana players
2017 CONCACAF Gold Cup players
C.D. Árabe Unido players
Panamanian expatriate footballers
Panamanian expatriate sportspeople in Mexico
Expatriate footballers in Mexico
Association football fullbacks